Cylix tupareomanaia, named the Manaia pygmy pipehorse, is a species of syngnathid, the family of seahorses and pipefish. The species is found temperate coastal waters of New Zealand, at Taitokerau Northland and the inshore islands, Pēwhairangi (Bay of Islands), Nukutaunga, Tawhiti Rahi and Aorangi, occurring at depths between twelve and twenty metres. The head is notably angled and tail is prehensile.

It occupies habitat composed of algae, sponges and bryozoans at coral outcrops and reefs. The description was published in 2021, the first new species of syngnathid of New Zealand to be identified in 100 years. The authors distinguished the animal as a new genus Cylix, the Greek or Latin word for cup, a reference to the shape of the 'coronet' feature of its head. The researchers collaborated with the Ngātiwai people, traditional owners of the region where the species is found, their elders providing cultural information and names. The specific epithet 'tupareomanaia' derives from Tu Pare o Manaia, translating as "the garland of the Manaia". The Maori name for a seahorse, 'Manaia', was also used for the common name assigned by the authors.

Resembling other species of pygmy pipehorse of the indopacific region, genetic analysis indicates divergence from species of Acentronura and Idiotropiscis around 13 million years ago. A superficial resemblance to other species of Hippocampus, which also possess a coronet structure, saw early collections of this fish misidentified as ''Hippocampus jugumus, a rare species of the pacific southwest.

References
Short, G. A. and Trnski, T. (2021). A New Genus and Species of Pygmy Pipehorse from Taitokerau Northland, Aotearoa New Zealand, with a Redescription of Acentronura Kaup, 1853 and Idiotropiscis Whitley, 1947 (Teleostei, Syngnathidae). Ichthyology & Herpetology 109(3): 806–835. https://doi.org/10.1643/i2020136
https://australian.museum/blog/amri-news/a-beautiful-new-cryptic-fish-species-endemic-to-aotearoa-new-zealand-the-manaia-pygmy-pipehorse/

Syngnathidae
Endemic marine fish of New Zealand